Money Monster is a 2016 American crime thriller film directed by Jodie Foster, with a screenplay by Jamie Linden, Alan Di Fiore, and Jim Kouf from a story by Di Fiore and Kauf. The film stars George Clooney (who also co-produced), Julia Roberts, Jack O'Connell, Dominic West, Caitríona Balfe, and Giancarlo Esposito. It follows financial television host Lee Gates and his producer Patty Fenn, as they are put in an extreme situation when an irate investor takes them and their crew as hostage.

Money Monster had its world premiere at the 69th Cannes Film Festival on May 12, 2016, and was theatrically released in the United States on May 13, 2016, by Sony Pictures Releasing. Despite receiving mixed reviews from critics, the film was a box office success, grossing over $93 million.

Plot

Flamboyant television financial expert Lee Gates is in the midst of the latest edition of his show, Money Monster. Less than 24 hours earlier, IBIS Clear Capital's stock inexplicably cratered, apparently due to a glitch in a trading algorithm, costing investors $800 million. Lee planned to have IBIS CEO Walt Camby appear for an interview, but he unexpectedly departed for a business trip to Geneva, Switzerland.

Midway through the show, a deliveryman wanders onto the set, pulls a gun and takes Lee hostage, forcing him to put on a vest laden with explosives. The man reveals that his name is Kyle Budwell, who invested $60,000—his entire life savings—in IBIS after Lee endorsed the company on camera. He was wiped out along with the other investors. Unless he gets some answers, Kyle will blow up Lee before killing himself. Once police are notified, they discover that the receiver to the bomb's vest is located over Lee's kidney. The only way to destroy the receiver—and with it, Kyle's leverage—is to shoot Lee and hope he survives.

With the help of longtime director Patty Fenn, Lee tries to calm Kyle and locate Camby, though Kyle is dissatisfied when both Lee and IBIS chief communications officer Diane Lester offer to compensate him for his financial loss. He is angered by Diane's insistence that the algorithm is to blame. Diane is not satisfied with her own explanation, either, and defies colleagues by contacting a programmer who created the algorithm, Won Joon. Reached in Seoul, Joon insists that an algorithm could not take such a large, lopsided position without someone meddling with it.

Lee appeals to his TV viewers for help, seeking to recoup the lost investment, but is dejected by their response. The NYPD find Kyle's pregnant girlfriend Molly and allow her to talk to Kyle through a video feed. When she learns that he lost everything, she viciously berates him before the police cut the feed. Lee, siding with Kyle, agrees to help his captor discover what went wrong.

Once Camby arrives, Diane flips through his passport, discovering that instead of going to Geneva he went to Johannesburg. With this clue, along with messages from Camby's phone, Patty and the Money Monster team contact a group of Icelandic hackers to seek the truth. After a police sniper misses a shot at Lee, he and Kyle resolve to corner Camby at Federal Hall National Memorial, where, according to Diane, Camby is headed. They head out with network cameramen, Lenny, plus the police, and a mob of fans and jeerers alike. Having earned his trust, Kyle admits to Lee that the vest did not actually contain explosives, simply clay. Kyle accidentally shoots and wounds producer Ron Sprecher when Ron throws Lee a new earpiece. Kyle and Lee finally confront Camby with video evidence obtained by the hackers.

Camby had bribed a South African miners' union, planning to have IBIS make an $800 million investment in a platinum mine while the union was on strike. The strike lowered the mine's owner's stock, allowing Camby to buy it at a low price. Had his plan succeeded, IBIS would have generated a multibillion-dollar profit when mine work resumed and the owner's stock owner rose again. The gambit backfired when the union stayed on the picket line. Camby attempted to bribe union leader Moshe Mambo to stop the strike, but he refused, causing IBIS' stock to sink under the weight of its position in the failing company.

Despite the evidence, Camby refuses to admit his swindle until Kyle takes the explosive vest off Lee and puts it on him. He finally admits to his wrongdoing on live camera. Satisfied with the outcome, Kyle throws the detonator away. Then Kyle, much to Lee's dismay, gets fatally shot by the police. Lee punches Camby, as his greed and corruption cost Kyle his life. In the aftermath, the SEC announces that IBIS will be placed under investigation, while Camby is charged with violations of the Foreign Corrupt Practices Act.

Lee and Patty reconcile, wondering how they follow their last broadcast.

Cast
 George Clooney as Lee Gates
 Julia Roberts as Patty Fenn
 Jack O'Connell as Kyle Budwell
 Dominic West as Walt Camby
 Caitriona Balfe as Diane Lester
 Giancarlo Esposito as Captain Marcus Powell
 Christopher Denham as Ron Sprecher
 Lenny Venito as Lenny, The Cameraman
 Chris Bauer as Lieutenant Nelson
 Dennis Boutsikaris as Avery, Goodloe CFO
 Emily Meade as Molly
 Makhaola Ndebele as Moshe Mambo
 Condola Rashād as Bree, The Assistant
 Aaron Yoo as Won Joon
 Olivia Luccardi as Arlene
 Anthony DeSando as Officer Benson
 John Ventimiglia as A Team Leader
 Grant Rosenmeyer as Dave
 Greta Lee as Amy
 Laura Meakin as Wall Street Woman
 Cenk Uygur as Himself

Production

Development
The project Money Monster was first announced by Deadline on February 7, 2012, when Daniel Dubiecki launched his own film production company, The Allegiance Theater. It would be the company's first produced film. IM Global financed while Dubiecki produced, along with Stuart Ford.

Alan Di Fiore and Jim Kouf wrote the script of the film. On October 11, 2012, Jodie Foster was set to direct the film. Lara Alameddine also produced the film.  The story was altered from its original script inspired by the stock market glitch and crash of Cynk Technologies.

On July 25, 2014, TriStar Pictures won the rights to finance and release the film, whose latest draft was written by Jamie Linden. Clooney and Grant Heslov also produced for their Smoke House Pictures.

Casting
On May 8, 2014, it was announced that George Clooney was director Foster's choice to star in the film as a TV personality, Lee Gates, but the deal was not yet confirmed. Clooney's involvement was confirmed in July 2014. Jack O'Connell and Julia Roberts were added to the cast November 14, 2014 to star along with Clooney in the film. Caitriona Balfe joined the cast of the film on January 29, 2015, to play the head of PR of the company whose stock bottomed. Dominic West signed-on on February 25, 2015 to play the CEO of the company. Christopher Denham also joined the cast on March 4, 2015, playing Ron, a producer on the show.

Filming
In October 2012, filming was scheduled to begin early 2013. In July 2014, it was announced that production would begin after Clooney completed the Coen brothers' Hail, Caesar!, and principal photography on the film began in New York City on February 27, 2015.

On April 8, filming began on Wall Street in the Financial District, Manhattan, where it would last for 15 days. A scene was also shot in front of Federal Hall National Memorial. Some re-shooting for the film took place in mid-January 2016 in New York City on William Street and Broad Street.

Release
In August 2015, Sony Pictures Entertainment set the film for an April 8, 2016 release. The film was later pushed back to May 13, 2016.
The Money Monster Premiered in Cannes on May 12, 2016, where the cast attended the photocall and screening in the evening.

Reception

Box office
Money Monster grossed $41 million in the United States and Canada, and $52.3 million in other territories, for a worldwide total of $93.3 million, against a net production budget of $27 million.

In North America, the film was released alongside The Darkness and the wide expansion of Green Room, and was projected to gross $10–12 million from 3,104 theaters in its opening weekend. The film grossed $600,000 from its early Thursday night previews and $5 million on its first day. It went on to gross $14.8 million in its opening weekend, beating expectations and finishing 3rd at the box office behind Captain America: Civil War ($72.6 million) and The Jungle Book ($17.1 million). It fell 53% to $7 million in its second weekend, finishing 6th.

Critical response

On Rotten Tomatoes the film holds an approval rating of 59% based on 287 reviews, with an average rating of 6.00/10. The site's critics consensus reads: "Money Monsters strong cast and solidly written story ride a timely wave of socioeconomic anger that's powerful enough to overcome an occasionally muddled approach to its worthy themes." On Metacritic the film has a weighted average score of 55 out of 100, based on 44 critics, indicating "mixed or average reviews". Audiences polled by CinemaScore gave the film an average grade of "B+" on an A+ to F scale, while PostTrak reported filmgoers gave an 81% overall positive score, with 56% saying they would definitely recommend it.

Clooney's performance was praised by critics. A.O. Scott of The New York Times said that the "quality of the acting both enhances the credibility of the narrative and exposes some of its weak points." Christy Lemire of RogerEbert.com, in a mixed review, praised Clooney's "enormous charisma", but criticised the film for not "being quite as thrilling or thought-provoking as [its] premise sounds." Chris Hewitt of Empire however gave a more positive review.

Several reviewers praised the atmosphere of suspense. Sandra Hall of The Sydney Morning Herald praised the film, particularly Foster's directing and her ability to "keep things moving". Richard Brody of The New Yorker wrote that Foster "keeps the action vigorous and the suspense high", but said that the film was "swallowed up by the very hectoring and impersonal sensationalism that it derides."

Some reviewers criticised the script. Wendy Ide of The Guardian gave the film a negative review, writing that the film lacks the "authentic anger" of The Big Short and the "sniper-like accuracy" of Network, criticising Clooney's "complete lack of sincerity". Peter Travers of Rolling Stone said that what the script lacks in "emotional subtext" can be found in the cast's "richly detailed" performances. In a mixed review, Robbie Collin of The Telegraph called the film a "raucous hostage thriller that eschews explanation for wish-fulfillment", concluding by saying that "in the heat of the moment, Money Monsters bluster and nerve keeps you hooked." Josh Lasser of IGN was critical of the film's mix of comedy and drama, calling the transitions "too fast, ripping the audience out of the unfolding drama."

Despite comparisons of Clooney's character to Jim Cramer and his TV show Mad Money, Clooney and Foster denied this.

References

External links

  
 Money Monster at Box Office Mojo
 Money Monster at Fandango
 
 
 
 Money Monster Trailer
 Money Monster on Twitter

2016 films
American business films
American thriller films
Films about film directors and producers
Films about hostage takings
Films about television
Fictional television shows
Films directed by Jodie Foster
Films produced by George Clooney
Films produced by Grant Heslov
Films scored by Dominic Lewis
Films shot in New York City
Films set in New York City
Films set in Manhattan
Trading films
Wall Street films
Smokehouse Pictures films
TriStar Pictures films
Films about financial crises
Works about algorithmic trading
2016 thriller films
2010s business films
2010s English-language films
2010s American films